Consall is a small village situated in the Staffordshire Moorlands, Staffordshire, England.  It is approximately 6 miles south of the market town of Leek and 8 miles east of Stoke-on-Trent.  According to the last Census taken in 2001, Consall had a population of 118, increasing to 150 at the 2011 census.

Agriculture still plays a large part in the village, but the number of farms and workers has decreased over the years. The main area of agriculture around the Consall area is dairy farming.

Consall has a relatively large number of visitor attractions considering the size of the village. Whilst in Consall you can visit Consall railway station, Consall Nature Park and also the recently opened Consall Hall Landscape Gardens.

Consall Nature Park is situated in the Churnet Valley and has its own visitor centre along with a number of nature trails. During the summer the visitor centre is open every day and the trails range in length and difficulty for those who wish to simply have a leisurely stroll and also for those who wish for a more invigorating walk.

Consall Hall Landscape Gardens are open to the public from April until October and are the result of over 50 years of design and planning by the current owner Mr William Podmore OBE.  The gardens have a Tea room that is available during normal opening hours and the Gardens are also available for Civil Wedding ceremonies.

Also in the Churnet Valley is Consall Forge Pottery where a craftsman potter makes and sells hand-thrown domestic stoneware ceramics.

Consall Railway Station is on the Churnet Valley Railway network. The station was re-opened to passengers in July 1998 and it is possible to reach the villages of Froghall and Cheddleton from the station. For a considerable part of the journey the railway runs alongside the Caldon Canal, and about 1/2 mile further down the rough vehicle track past the Railway Station you will come to a mooring area for canal barges and also the Black Lion public house which you reach by crossing the bridge from the pub car park.

Continuing past the Black Lion car park will bring you to Consall Lime Kilns. These lime kilns have recently been restored with assistance from the Heritage Lottery Fund.  These kilns date from the early 19th century and coal and limestone was bought along the canal to the kilns. The lime kilns ceased to be in use sometime in the mid to late 19th century.

See also
Listed buildings in Consall

References

External links 

 Consall Nature Park
 Consall Forge Pottery
 Consall Hall Landscape Gardens
 Consall Railway Station
 Churnet Valley Railway
 Consall Scout Camp 

Villages in Staffordshire
Staffordshire Moorlands
Lime kilns in the United Kingdom